KSCR-FM (93.5 FM; "93.5 KSCR") is a radio station broadcasting a variety music format. Licensed to Benson, Minnesota, United States, the station is currently owned by Justin Klinghagen and John Jennings, through licensee Headwaters Media, LLC.

History
The station was assigned call sign KBMO-FM on 1979-12-03.  On 1985-07-01, the station changed its call sign to KSCR, then on 1990-02-26 to the current KSCR-FM.

References

External links
 93.5 KSCR Online
 

Radio stations in Minnesota
Radio stations established in 1979
1979 establishments in Minnesota